YIIK: A Postmodern RPG (supposed to be pronounced "why-two-kay", but more commonly pronounced "yeek") is an indie role-playing video game by American developer Ackk Studios for Microsoft Windows, MacOS, PlayStation 4, and Nintendo Switch. The game was released on January 17, 2019. It has received mixed reviews from critics.

Gameplay
The game is a colorful 3D Japanese-style RPG. It is set in the 1990s and is based around a mystery in a small town. There are eight characters who are message board friends. They work together to investigate the mystery around a viral video star called Semi Pak, who goes missing in a supernatural event. The player can control the characters in turn-based battles where normal everyday objects are used as weapons. The combat consists of turn-based moves with timing-based actions which can increase the damage of an attack or minimize the damage taken from an opponent. There are six dungeons to explore which include battles, puzzles which have to be solved and traps that have to be avoided. There are approximately twenty five hours of gameplay.

Plot
On April 4, 1999, Alex Eggleston (Chris Niosi) returns to his hometown of Frankton, New Jersey after receiving his B.L.A. While out on an errand, a cat steals Alex's shopping list and leads him into a surreal abandoned factory, where he meets and befriends Semi "Sammy" Pak (Kelley Nicole Dugan). In the factory's elevator, Sammy is suddenly kidnapped by two otherworldly beings and vanishes. The next day, he returns to the factory with his neighbor Michael K. (Clifford Chapin), and they obtain photographic evidence of what Alex describes as "a being made of stars". 

After uploading the photos to ONISM1999, a social media site pioneered by Michael, they are led to Vella Wilde (Melanie Ehrlich), an employee of the town's amusement arcade. She identifies the beings as "Soul Survivors", manifestations of souls that have left their realities and search for a physical form in another. To aid Alex and Michael in engaging with Soul Survivors, Vella gives them a phone number that allows them to access a metaphysical space known as the Mind Dungeon, where Vella had developed an ability to manipulate and weaponize sound using her keytar.

Alex receives a message from someone who claims that his sister had vanished in similarly strange circumstances to Sammy and beckons the group for further investigation. Alex, Vella, and Michael meet Rory Mancer (Andrew Fayette), who leads them into the town's sewer system, where he believes the soul of his sister Carrie resides. Instead, they encounter the Soul Survivor of an alternate version of Rory. He confesses that Carrie committed suicide, and he tells of glimpsing the Soul Survivor in the "Soul Space" – the space between realities – during a despair-induced out-of-body experience. Following a confrontation with the Soul Survivor and a bizarre golden alpaca, a resentful Alex insensitively calls out Rory for his deceit, pushing him away from the group.

Alex has a recurring dream of a motionless woman made of plastic. A Soul Survivor materializes in Alex's house and leads him to a radio tower, where he finds an empty jacket for the record Mystical Ultima LP Legend. Suspecting that the Entity wants the record to be broadcast, Alex searches for a copy of the record. During this time, he may or may not apologize to Rory depending on the player's choice, and he befriends record store chain owner Claudio Unkrich (Anthony Sardinha) and his sister Chondra (Michaela Laws), who feel that the circumstances surrounding Sammy overlap with that of their missing young brother Aaron. After learning that Vella is the record's artist and retrieving it from her Mind Dungeon, the group broadcasts the record from the radio tower. The plastic woman from Alex's dream, the Essentia 2000 (also Ehrlich), awakens in an isolated van. Alex and Vella psychically witness the Essentia 2000 eliminate a pair of Soul Survivors, and they resolve to find her. At this point, Alex can optionally allow Rory to privately discuss his ongoing depression.

When the group locates Essentia's van, she brings Alex into her Mind Dungeon, where she claims to be a parallel version of both Sammy and Vella. Sammy, who had made the decision to leave her physical body and enter the Soul Space, was taken by two-thirds of her soul that had already made the transition. Prior to Sammy's disappearance, Essentia's physical body was captured and held captive by Soul Survivors, and her soul entered Alex's house when Sammy was taken. A tour of Essentia's parallel lives culminates in the revelation that Alex is the destroyer of other realities, and she foretells the end of his own upon the New Year. She suggests that Alex and his friends escape to the Soul Space to help prevent the end of other realities, but Alex insists on attempting to save his own reality despite the futility.

Re-emerging from Essentia's Mind Dungeon days later, Alex gathers his friends to prepare them for their reality's impending end. During Alex's time away, Michael had accessed the Soul Space and discovered his own parallel lives, achieving an enlightened state named Proto-Michael. The group decides to train themselves in their Mind Dungeons during the course of a month. Depending on how Alex had treated Rory throughout the game, Rory may or may not commit suicide in a fit of misanthropy during this time. On New Year's Eve, reality begins to collapse, and Alex finds his friends supplanted by crude replications who have no recollection of their mission. The group goes to Times Square to watch the ball drop. When a meteorite-like form of Alex, Comet Alex, approaches the Square, Proto-Michael re-emerges, jogging the group's memories. Although they fight valiantly against Comet Alex, they ultimately fail, and Alex's reality is destroyed. Alex is left alone to drift in the Soul Space until he comes across a floating rock inhabited by other versions of Alex, who had abandoned their realities instead of resisting. On the other side of the rock, Alex encounters versions of Proto-Alex, the pilot of Comet Alex, planning on destroying another reality.

Endings
Alex can join Proto-Alex, in which case the game's credits rush by and close with a passive-aggressive message. If Alex does not join Proto-Alex, he instead follows Comet Alex, watching it destroy many other realities. Drifting away, Alex eventually finds a planet not yet destroyed by Comet Alex and taking place in the present day. He decides to recruit the player, who is revealed to be another version of Alex, and versions of his friends from that reality in a bid to defeat Proto-Alex once and for all. Proto-Alex, who is mechanically conjoined with Essentia, reveals that Essentia is not a version of Sammy and Vella, but another version of Alex. Essentia had been manipulating Alex in the hopes of eliminating Proto-Alex and taking control of their collective soul, using Sammy as bait. Alex again fails, but is encouraged to return to life by Roy, the protagonist of Ackk Studios' first video game Two Brothers. Alex and the player simultaneously deactivate both Essentia and Proto-Alex, and all Alexes are absorbed into the player.

If on New Year's Eve Alex reads an online message from Sammy confirming Essentia's duplicity, he can instead go to a news studio that Sammy was to intern at prior to her disappearance and perform her job. At the studio's elevator, Alex finally reunites with Sammy, who addresses him as the player and urges him to abandon this reality and explore the Soul Space with her.

Development
The game is built on the Unity game engine. It began development in 2013, with brothers Andrew and Brian Allanson creating a fully-featured prototype in 52 days for showcase at PAX East 2013. After seeing the game in action at the event, the publisher Ysbryd Games entered an agreement to publish YIIK: A Postmodern RPG.

Around this time, the Allansons' mother was diagnosed with cancer, which would later result in her death. This caused the team to rework parts of the game's plot, making an effort to "[have] a more 'humanistic' perspective" and "sand down some of the game’s more cynical edges." By the end of this period, nearly a quarter of the game had been remade, including a slight change of the game's ending.

A pre-release demo was released in June 2016 on Microsoft Windows and MacOS.

In 2020, Ackk Studios announced multiple free updates for the game that would improve the game's combat mechanics while adding additional quality of life features. New content for its story would also be added through these updates under the titles of "Deviation Perspectives". The first update was released for PC in January 2021 and included the new combat system as well as a reimagined Golden Alpaca (D.C. Douglas) boss battle as the first major change.

Reception

YIIK: A Postmodern RPG received "mixed or average reviews" on all versions according to review aggregator Metacritic.

Reviewers had mixed reactions to the game's combat; while the presentation and variety of the attacks was commended, the steep learning curve for timing the attacks, clunky input response and lack of power balance were said to result in slow-paced battles. Derek Heemsbergen of RPGFan found the controls to be universally "slippery". Jason Faulkner of GameRevolution appreciated the absence of random encounters, which allows the player to choose when to engage in combat. Reactions to the leveling system were generally lukewarm; reviewers summarized the system as initially novel, but ultimately tedious and obtuse. Neal Ronaghan of Nintendo World Report found the puzzles to be ingenious and enjoyable. Eric Bailey of Nintendo Life, while determining the puzzles to never be random or unfair, experienced occasional frustration from the "real lateral-thinking" challenges. Cian Maher of GameSpot acknowledged that the early puzzles were enjoyable and fit the game's style, but warned that later puzzles had more arbitrary solutions and were susceptible to bugs. Ronaghan criticized the frequency of the load times and their detriment to the game's pacing. Kevin Mersereau of Destructoid was also irritated by the "archaic and sluggish" save screen. Maher and Kyle McClair of Hardcore Gamer criticized the finale for its monotonous grinding.

The visuals were widely praised as bright, colorful and reminiscent of fifth-generation video games. Faulkner compared the environments to Mega Man Legends and the characters' combat animations to Final Fantasy VII. However, he considered the text font to be unpleasant. The soundtrack was also commended as catchy and eclectic, with Hiroki Kikuta and Toby Fox's contributions receiving particular notice. Zach Welhouse of RPGamer found the voice acting to be honest and relatable, which he said balances out the story's surreal moments, and considered Fayette, Sardinha and Ehrlich to be the standout performances. Heemsbergen also appreciated Ehrlich's performance, but faulted the voice direction for occasionally fumbled lines and "tonally dissonant" conversations. He elaborated that "Alex's lines are generally delivered well, but when he retreats into Murakami-esque introspection, he has a tendency to come across awkwardly due to the more poetic timbre of his narration".

Reviewers were polarized by the game's writing. Mersereau, Faulkner, and Heemsbergen lambasted the main character Alex as an unlikable hipster stereotype. While they felt this characterization made narrative sense, they nevertheless found the gameplay experience unpleasant as a result. Faulkner additionally dismissed the rest of the cast for their "hip" characteristics, but found plentiful dry humor in interpreting the characterizations as deliberate. Bailey, however, considered Alex to be relatable in his loneliness and solace in subcultures. LeClair praised the plot for its elaborate mythos, thematic abundance, and humor, and he enjoyed the game's cast, singling out Claudio as a personal favorite for his enthusiasm. Maher was intrigued by the characters, but found difficulty in caring for them due to their lack of development. He also deemed the game's "post-modern" elements to be pretentious and inadequately built upon. Bailey and Ronaghan faulted the dialogue for its excessive exposition and digressions. Faulkner, LeClair and Ronaghan compared the game's presentation to EarthBound, with Faulkner remarking that it "is a lot like if the Earthbound kids had never gone and saved the world and instead grew up to be weird hipster adults", and Ronaghan interpreting the game's setting as a nihilistic and cynical counterpart to EarthBounds idealistic and upbeat depiction of Americana.

The game was criticized for referencing the death of Elisa Lam.

Notes

References

2019 video games
Indie video games
MacOS games
Nintendo Switch games
Role-playing video games
Video games developed in the United States
Video games involved in plagiarism controversies
Video games scored by Hiroki Kikuta
Video games scored by Toby Fox
Video games set in 1999
Video games set in New Jersey
Windows games